Mukarram Turgunbaeva (1913–1978) was an Uzbekistani choreographer and dancer of the Soviet era.

Born in Shakhrikhan in the Andijan Region, Turgunbaeva was orphaned early in life and brought up in the family of an uncle. She became interested in dance through the agency of her grandmother, and later worked as an actress in the experimental theater in Samarkand. She fused traditional Uzbek dance and western classical dance in her performances, presenting versions of each alongside one another. The choreography which she produced for many traditional dances, such as the tanovar dances, remain the standard by which other performances are judged. In 1939 she was involved in the establishment of Muqimi, the first musical theater in Uzbekistan, having previously choreographed the ballet Pakhta (Cotton) there in 1933; she also worked on Shakhida, about the battle against the basmachi, in 1938. She founded the Bahor Ensemble in 1957; still a highly regarded performing group in contemporary Uzbekistan, it credits her as the choreographer of many of its repertory pieces. For her work she was named a People's Artist of Uzbekistan. A museum dedicated to Turgunbaeva and her work exists in Tashkent. Its collections focus on dance in the 1920s and 1930s, and its exhibits present costumes, posters, and other memorabilia along with a collection of recordings of Uzbek folk music.

References

1913 births
1978 deaths
Uzbekistani dancers
Uzbekistani choreographers
Women choreographers
Soviet dancers
People's Artists of Uzbekistan
People from Andijan Region
Female dancers
Soviet choreographers